Iva Zanicchi (born 18 January 1940) is an Italian pop singer and politician. She has a mezzo-soprano voice and is nick-named by the press as Eagle of Ligonchio".

Biography
Iva Zanicchi was born in Ligonchio, in the province of Reggio Emilia to Zefiro (1909–2004) and Elsa Raffaelli (1914–2010). Her career began in 1962 at the Castrocaro Music Festival, where she earned third place. She won the Sanremo song festival in 1967 with Non pensare a me, in 1969 with "Zingara" and again in 1974 with "Ciao cara, come stai?". Zanicchi remains the only woman singer to have won that festival's prize three times. In 1969, she represented Italy in the Eurovision Song Contest in Madrid with "Due grosse lacrime bianche", finishing 13th. She represented Italy in the V  in Rio with Tu non-sei più innamorato di me in 1970. A concert at the Paris Olympia and a tour (United States, Canada, South America and the Soviet Union) followed. Zanicchi later also toured Australia and Japan. Has worked with Mikis Theodorakis, Charles Aznavour and Luigi Tenco, and has made numerous recordings. Has performed at Madison Square Gardens, New York (1974) and the Teatro Regio (Parma). In total, Zanicchi released 14 albums during the 1970s, including a Christmas-themed, Neapolitan and Spanish language recordings.

From 1987 to 2000 Zanicchi hosted the television game show OK, il Prezzo è Giusto!, the Italian version of The Price Is Right as the only female host in the history of the game show worldwide (since then, other countries have had versions of the show hosted by a woman).

In 2004 she was one of Forza Italia's candidates at the European Parliament elections, polling nearly 35,000 but not enough to be elected. However, as the highest-polling among the candidates failing to be elected, Zanicchi took up her seat in Strasburg in May 2008, representing Forza Italia, when EuroMP Mario Mantovani left to become a PdL senator. She was confirmed in her post at the European elections of June 2009.

Curiosity
In 2009, a band called I VazzaNikki was started, the name being a clear reference and tribute to Iva Zanicchi. The idea of the group came during a conversation between the Italian comedians Valerio Lundini, who is one of the singers and the keyboard player of the band, and Greg, who suggested the name. The objective was to play rock'n'roll and rockabilly music, inspired by the American 1950s. The band characterizes for ironic and nonsense songs, and even performed in the TV broadcast Una pezza di Lundini, hosted by Lundini on Rai Uno.

Discography

Albums
1965 Iva Zanicchi
1967 Fra noi
1968 Unchained Melody
1970 Iva senza tempo
1970 Caro Theodorakis... Iva
1971 Caro Aznavour... Iva
1971 Caro Tenco... Iva
1971 Shalom
1972 Fantasia
1972 Dall'amore in poi
1973 Le giornate dell'amore
1974 Io ti propongo
1974 ¿Chao Iva cómo estás? (Spanish)
1975 Io sarò la tua idea
1976 Confessioni
1976 The Golden Orpheus '76 (live in Bulgaria)
1976 Cara Napoli
1978 Con la voglia di te
1978 Playboy
1980 D'Iva
1980 D'Iva (Spanish Version)1981 Iva Zanicchi1981 Nostalgias (Spanish)1982 Yo, por amarte (Spanish)1984 Quando arriverà1984 Iva 851987 Care colleghe1988 Nefertari1991 Come mi vorrei2003 Fossi un tango2009 Colori d'amore2013 In cerca di teSingles (Italy)
1963 Zero in amore / Come un tramonto1963 Tu dirai/Sei ore1964 Come ti vorrei/La nostra spiaggia1964 Credi/Resta sola come sei1964 Come ti vorrei / Chi potrà amarti1965 I tuoi anni più belli / Un altro giorno verrà 1965 Accarezzami amore / Mi cercherai1965 Caro mio / Non tornar mai1966 La notte dell'addio / Caldo è l'amore1966 Fra noi / Gold Snake1966 Ma pecché / Tu saje a verità1966 Monete d’oro / Ci amiamo troppo1967 Non pensare a me / Vita1967 Quel momento / Dove è lui1967 Le montagne (ci amiamo troppo) / Vivere non-vivere1967 Dolcemente / Come stai bene e tu?1968 Per vivere / Non accetterò1968 Amore amor / Sleeping1968 La felicità / Anche così1968 La felicità / Ci vuole così poco1968 Senza catene / Diverso dagli altri1969 Zingara / Io sogno1969 Due grosse lacrime bianche / Tienimi con te1969 Un bacio sulla fronte / Accanto a te1969 Che vuoi che sia / Perché mai1969 Vivrò / Estasi d'amore1970 L'arca di Noé / Aria di settembre1970 Un uomo senza tempo / Un attimo1970 Un fiume amaro / Il sogno é fumo1970 Un fiume amaro / Tienimi con te1970 Una storia di mezzanotte / Il bimbo e la gazzella1971 La riva bianca e la riva nera / Tu non-sei più innamorato di me1971 Coraggio e paura / Sciogli i cavalli al vento1972 Ma che amore / Il mio bambino1972 Nonostante lei / Non scordarti di me1972 Alla mia gente / Dall'amore in poi1972 La mia sera / Il sole splende ancora1972 Mi ha stregato il viso tuo / A te1973 I mulini della mente / Basterà1973 Le giornate dell'amore / Chi mi manca é lui1973 Fred Bongusto:White Christmas/ Natale dura un giorno1974 L'indifferenza / Sarà domani1974 Ciao cara come stai? / Vendetta1974 Testarda io / Sei tornato a casa tua1975 Testarda io / E la notte é qui1975 Io sarò la tua idea / Jesus1976 Mamma tutto / Dormi,amore dormi1976 I discorsi tuoi / Confessioni1977 Arrivederci padre / Che uomo sei1977 Munasterio 'e Santa Chiara / 'O destino1977 Mal d'amore / Selvaggio1978 Con la voglia di te / Sei contento1979 Per te / Pronto 1131979 La valigia / Ditemi1979 A parte il fatto / Capirai1981 Ardente / E tu mai1983 Aria di luna / Amico1984 Chi (mi darà) / Comandante1984 Quando arriverà / Sera di vento1985 Da domani senza te / Aria di luna1987 Volo / Uomini e no2001 Ho bisogno di te 2009 Ti voglio senza amoreSanremo Music Festival
1965 I tuoi anni più belli (Mogol-Gaspari-Polito), coupled with Gene Pitney
1966 La notte dell'addio (Diverio-Testa), coupled with Vic Dana
1967 Non pensare a me, coupled with Claudio Villa
1968 Per vivere (Nisa-Bindi), coupled with Udo Jürgens
1969 Zingara (Albertelli-Riccardi), coupled with Bobby Solo
1970 L'arca di Noè (Endrigo), coupled with Sergio Endrigo
1974 Ciao cara come stai? (Dinaro-Daiano-Janne-Malgioglio)
1984 Chi (mi darà) (Balsamo-Malgioglio-Balsamo)
2003 Fossi un tango (Lana-Donati)
2009 Ti voglio senza amore2022 Voglio amartiBibliography
2001 Polenta di castagne2005 I prati di SaraFilmography

Game show host
She hosted the Italian version of The Price Is Right, called OK, il prezzo è giusto''. She took over Gigi Sabani in the 1986–87 season and was succeeded by Maria Teresa Ruta in 2000.

References

External links
Official site
 
Fan site
European Parliament biography of Iva Zanicchi

1940 births
Living people
Eurovision Song Contest entrants for Italy
Eurovision Song Contest entrants of 1969
Italian women singers
Sanremo Music Festival winners
People from the Province of Reggio Emilia
The People of Freedom MEPs
Forza Italia MEPs
MEPs for Italy 2004–2009
MEPs for Italy 2009–2014
21st-century women MEPs for Italy
Scepter Records artists
Spanish-language singers of Italy